State Route 12 (SR 12) is a highway from Davidson County, Tennessee to Montgomery County, Tennessee.

Route description

Davidson County

SR 12 begins in downtown Nashville at an intersection with US 31/US 41/US 431/US 41A/SR 6/SR 11, concurrent with US 41A as its unsigned companion route. They go north and have an interchange with I-65. They then curve to the east and start paralleling the Cumberland River before they cross it. US 41A/SR 12 then enter Nashville's northern suburbs before they separate at a y-intersection where child route SR 112 begins and US 41A follows SR 112. SR 12 becomes signed as a primary highway and turns west, coming to an interchange with SR 155 (Briley Parkway). It continues east and then leaves Nashville. SR 12 then passes through the mountains of the Highland Rim before exiting it and Davidson County and entering Cheatham County.

Cheatham County

In Cheatham County, SR 12 starts paralleling the Cumberland River before entering Ashland City. In Ashland City, it has a junction with SR 455 (Ashland City Bypass) before entering downtown and having an intersection and short concurrency with SR 49/SR 249. SR 12 then has another intersection with SR 455 (Ashland City Bypass) before leaving Ashland City. It then turns north and goes through some rural farmland before crossing into Montgomery County.

Montgomery County

In Montgomery County, SR 12 passes through Fredonia before entering Clarksville at an intersection with US 41A Bypass. SR 12 then becomes unsigned again as it runs along the southeast boundary of Clarksville before coming to an intersection and becoming concurrent with SR 13/SR 48, turning north. They then continue into downtown, again following the Cumberland River, and coming to an intersection were SR 48 separates. They then continue north on the banks of the river to an intersection with US 41A, US 79, SR 76, and SR 112 where US 41A bypass ends. While SR 112 ends at this intersection, SR 12 turns north on US 41A/US 79/SR 76, and SR 13 turns east on US 79. They then go north through a business district before US 79/SR 76 split of and go west, and US 41A/SR 12 go north and have an interchange with SR 374 (Purple Heart Parkway) before leaving Clarksville. US 41A/SR 12 then continues north and have a junction with SR 236 before crossing the Kentucky state line and entering Oak Grove, KY where SR 12 ends and US 41A continues as US 41 ALT.

Related route

State Route 455, the Tennessee Waltz Parkway, is a short bypass around Ashland City in Cheatham County. The general routing is southeast–northwest. The route is a continuation of a bypass from State Route 12 to State Route 49 which runs by the A.O. Smith water heater factory to a point just north of the Cumberland River bridge which was not originally designated a state route, but came under state maintenance when SR 455 was created. State Route 455 has its origins in a 1997 referendum in which the voters of Ashland City authorized a 1/2 cent sales tax increase with proceeds going to build and maintain a continuation of the bypass back around to Route 12. The road was finally completed in 2005.

Major intersections

See also 
List of state routes in Tennessee

References 

012